Vittoria Cremers (Vittoria Cassini; born c. 1859), was an Italian Theosophist.

Early years
Cremers in Pisa, Italy, was the daughter of the Italian, Manrico Vittorio Cassini and his British wife, Agnes Elizabeth Rutherford.

Career
Cremers had experience in publishing. After having read the book Light on the Path, written by Mabel Collins though first anonymously issued in 1885, Cremers felt prompted to immediately join the Theosophical Society. In 1888 she travelled to Britain to meet Madame Blavatsky. As she had been previously involved with publishing, Blavatsky asked her to take over the business side of the Theosophical journal  Lucifer. Cremers was soon introduced to Mabel Collins, with whom she became firm friends. According to Jean Overton Fuller, Cremers was close to Aleister Crowley and Victor Neuberg and claimed to know the identity of Jack the Ripper (supposedly Robert D'Onston Stephenson).

Personal life
In Manhattan, New York on November 26, 1886, she married the Russian Baron Louis Cremers, born in 1851 in St. Petersburg, Russia, son of the banker Louis Cremers and his wife, Anna von Struve who separated in 1887.

References 

People from Pisa
Italian Theosophists
1850s births
Year of death missing